Stere "Sterică" Adamache (17 August 1941 – 9 July 1978) was a Romanian football goalkeeper.

Club career
Stere Adamache, nicknamed "Baronul" (The Baron), was born on 17 August 1941 in Galați, Romania. He started to play football at junior level as a field player in 1955 at Energia Galați, afterwards moving at Ancora Galați where he started to play as a goalkeeper, later at Știința Galați and started his senior career by playing two Divizia B seasons at Dinamo Galați. He made his Divizia A debut on 9 September 1962, playing for Viitorul București in a 0–0 against Știința Cluj, shortly afterwards the club dissolved and he had offers to play for Steaua București and Steagul Roșu Brașov and after a talk with the latter's coach, Silviu Ploeșteanu, he chose Steagul on the considerations that he would have had more opportunities to play. He remained at Steagul over the course of 13 seasons, the highlights of this period being a fourth place in the 1964–65 Divizia A season and 10 games played in European competitions, including a 4–2 against Espanyol Barcelona at the 1965–66 Inter-Cities Fairs Cup and a 3–2 victory on aggregate against Beşiktaş at the 1974–75 UEFA Cup, also at end of the 1967–68 Divizia A season, the club relegated to Divizia B, but Adamache stayed with the club, promoting back to the first division after one year. He played his last Divizia A match on 29 June 1975 in a 2–1 home victory against Dinamo București, a competition in which he has a total of 253 appearances and after one year of absence, he came out of retirement to play again for Steagul in the 1976–77 Divizia B, trying to help the team promote to Divizia A, but failing to do so. Adamache drowned and died at age 36 while swimming in the Danube in July 1978.

International career
Stere Adamache played 7 games at international level for Romania, making his debut in a friendly, under coach Angelo Niculescu, when he came as a substitute and replaced Rică Răducanu at half-time in a 2–0 loss against France. His following two games were a 2–2 against Peru and a 2–0 loss against the Soviet Union. Adamache was a member of Steagul Roșu Brașov's "Mexican trio", alongside Mihai Ivăncescu and Nicolae Pescaru who were part of Romania's 1970 Mexico World Cup squad, playing in all three games, including a 3–2 loss against Brazil in which he conceded two goals from Pelé and Jairzinho, being replaced in the 29th minute by Rică Răducanu. His last game for the national team was a 2–0 victory against Albania at the 1974 World Cup qualifiers. Adamache was also part of Romania's squad at the 1964 Summer Olympics.

Honours
Steagul Roșu Brașov
Divizia B: 1968–69

References

External links

1941 births
1978 deaths
Romanian footballers
Romania international footballers
Association football goalkeepers
Olympic footballers of Romania
Footballers at the 1964 Summer Olympics
1970 FIFA World Cup players
Liga I players
Liga II players
FC Brașov (1936) players
Accidental deaths in Romania
Deaths by drowning
Sportspeople from Galați